International Bridge may refer to:

Baudette-Rainy River International Bridge, connecting Rainy River, Ontario and Baudette, Minnesota
Fort Frances-International Falls International Bridge, connecting Fort Frances, Ontario and International Falls, Minnesota
International Railway Bridge, a railroad bridge connecting Fort Erie, Ontario and Buffalo, New York
Laredo International Bridge 1, connecting Laredo, Texas and Nuevo Laredo, Tamaulipas
Laredo International Bridge 2, connecting Laredo, Texas and Nuevo Laredo, Tamaulipas
Laredo International Bridge 3, connecting Laredo, Texas and Colombia, Nuevo León
Laredo International Bridge 4, connecting Laredo, Texas and Nuevo Laredo, Tamaulipas
Laredo International Railway Bridge, connecting Laredo, Texas and Nuevo Laredo, Tamaulipas
Pharr-Reynosa International Bridge, connecting Pharr, Texas and Reynosa, Tamaulipas
Sault Ste. Marie International Bridge, connecting Sault Ste. Marie, Ontario and Sault Ste. Marie, Michigan
Seaway International Bridge, connecting Cornwall, Ontario and Massena, New York

See also
International Railway Bridge (disambiguation)

 :Category:International bridges